The 1998–99 UAB Blazers men's basketball team represented the University of Alabama at Birmingham as a member of Conference USA during the 1998–99 NCAA Division I men's basketball season. This was head coach Murry Bartow's third season at UAB, and the Blazers played their home games at Bartow Arena. They finished the season 20–12, 10–6 in C-USA play and lost in the semifinals of the 1994 GMWC tournament. They received an at-large bid to the NCAA tournament as No. 12 seed in the West region. The Blazers were defeated by No. 5 seed Iowa, 77–64.

Roster

Schedule and results

|-
!colspan=9 style=| Regular season

|-
!colspan=9 style=| C-USA tournament

|-
!colspan=9 style=| NCAA tournament

References

UAB Blazers men's basketball seasons
UAB
UAB